This is a list of township-level divisions of the province of Henan, People's Republic of China (PRC). After province, prefecture, and county-level divisions, township-level divisions constitute the formal fourth-level administrative divisions of the PRC. However, this is not the case with Jiyuan City, which, as a sub-prefecture-level city, is also a county-level city under the direct administration of the provincial government; there township-level divisions form the third-level administrative division. There are a total of 2,341 such divisions in Henan, divided into 452 subdistricts, 855 towns, 6 ethnic towns, 1,016 townships, and 12 ethnic townships.

Zhengzhou

Erqi District
Subdistricts:
Huaihe Road Subdistrict, Jiefang Road Subdistrict, Minggong Road Subdistrict, Yima Road Subdistrict, Mifengzhang Subdistrict, Wulibao Subdistrict, Daxue Road Subdistrict, Jianzhong Avenue Subdistrict, Fuhua Avenue Subdistrict, Dehua Avenue Subdistrict, Songshan Road Subdistrict, Changjiang Road Subdistrict, Jingguang Road Subdistrict

The only town is Mazhai, and the only township is Houzhai Township

Guancheng Hui District
Subdistricts:
Beixia Avenue Subdistrict, Xidajie Subdistrict, Nanguan Subdistrict, Chengdong Road Subdistrict, Dongdajie Subdistrict, Erligang Subdistrict, Longhaima Road Subdistrict, South Zijingshan Road Subdistrict, East Hanghai Road Subdistrict

Towns:
Shibalihe

Townships:
Nancao Township, Putian Township

Huiji District
Subdistricts:
Xincheng Subdistrict, Liuzhai Subdistrict, Laoyachen Subdistrict, Changxing Road Subdistrict, Yingbin Road Subdistrict, Dahe Road Subdistrict

Towns:
Guying, Huayuankou

Jinshui District
Subdistricts:
Jingba Road Subdistrict, Huayuan Road Subdistrict, Renmin Road Subdistrict, Duling Avenue Subdistrict, Dashiqiao Subdistrict, Nanyang Road Subdistrict, Nanyang New Village Subdistrict, Wenhua Road Subdistrict, Fengchan Road Subdistrict, Dongfeng Road Subdistrict, Beilin Road Subdistrict, Weilai Road Road Subdistrict, Longzihu Subdistrict, Jicheng Road Subdistrict, Fenghuangtai Road Subdistrict, Xingda Road Subdistrict, Yangjin Road Subdistrict, Fengqing Road Subdistrict

Shangjie District
Subdistricts:
Jiyuan Road Subdistrict, Zhongxin Road Subdistrict, Xin'an Road Subdistrict, Gongye Road Subdistrict, Kuangshan Subdistrict

The only town is Xiawo

Zhongyuan District
Subdistricts:
Linshanzhai Subdistrict, Jianshe Road Subdistrict, Ruhe Road Subdistrict, Mianfang Road Subdistrict, Lüdongcun Subdistrict, Qinling Road Subdistrict, Sanguanmiao Subdistrict, Tongbai Road Subdistrict, West Hanghai Road Subdistrict, West Zhongyuan Road Subdistrict, Xiliuhu Subdistrict, Xushui Subdistrict

The only town is Shifo, and the only township is Gouzhao Township

Dengfeng
Subdistricts:
Songyang Subdistrict, Shaolin Subdistrict, Zhongyue Subdistrict

Towns:
Dajindian, Yingyang, Ludian, Gaocheng, Yangchengqu, Daye, Xuanhua, Xuzhuang

Townships:
Dongjindian Township, Baiping Township, Junzhao Township, Shidao Township, Tangzhuang Township

Gongyi
Subdistricts:
Xinhua Road Subdistrict, Dufu Road Subdistrict, Yong'an Road Subdistrict, Xiaoyi Subdistrict, Zijing Road Subdistrict

Towns:
Mihe, Xinzhong, Xiaoguan, Zhulin, Dayugou, Heluo, Zhanjie, Tangdian, Beishankou, Xicun, Zhitian, Huiguo, Luzhuang, Jiajinkou, Shecun

Xingyang
Subdistricts:
Suohe Subdistrict, Jingcheng Subdistrict

Towns:
Qiaolou, Yulong, Guangwu, Wangcun, Sishui, Gaoshan, Liuhe, Cuimiao, Jiayu

Townships:
Chengguan Township, Gaocun Township, Jinzhai Hui Ethnic Township

Xinmi
Subdistricts:
Qingpin Avenue Subdistrict, Xinhua Road Subdistrict, Xidajie Subdistrict, Kuangqu Subdistrict

Towns:
Chengguan, Niudian, Pingmo, Chaohua, Goutang, Dawei, Liuzhai, Baizhai, Yuecun, Laiji, Micun

Townships:
Yuanzhuang Township, Quliang Township

Other: Jianshan Scenic Area

Xinzheng
Subdistricts:
Xinjian Road Subdistrict, Xinhua Road Subdistrict, Xinyan Subdistrict

Towns:
Xincun, Xindian, Guanyinsi, Lihe, Hezhuang, Xuedian, Mengzhuang, Guodian, Longhu

Townships:
Chengguan Township, Baqian Township, Longwang Township

Zhongmu County
Subdistricts:
Qingnian Road Subdistrict, Dongfeng Road Subdistrict

Towns:
Hansi, Guandu, Langchenggang, Wantan, Baisha, Zheng'an, Zhangzhuang, Huangdian, Dameng, Jiulong, Liuji, Bagang, Yanminghu, Yaojia, Sanguanmiao

The only township is Diaojia Township

Anyang

Beiguan District
Subdistricts:
 Dengta Road Subdistrict, Doufuying Subdistrict, Hongqi Road Subdistrict, Huanbei Subdistrict, Jiefang Road Subdistrict, Minhang Road Subdistrict, Shuguang Road Subdistrict, Zhangdong Subdistrict, Zhangbei Subdistrict

Long'an District
Subdistricts:
 Taihangxiaoqu Subdistrict , Tiancun Subdistrict, Wenchang Avenue Subdistrict, Wenming Avenue Subdistrict, Zhangwu Subdistrict, Zhongzhou Road Subdistrict

The only town is Longquan

Townships:
 Dongfeng Township, Matoujian Township

Wenfeng District
Subdistricts:
 Baoliansi Subdistrict, Beidajie Subdistrict, Dongdajie Subdistricts, Guanghua Road Subdistrict, Nanguan Subdistrict, Tianshuijing Subdistrict, Tou'ersan Subdistrict, Xidajie Subdistrict, Xiguan Subdistrict, Yongming Road Subdistrict, Zhonghua Road Subdistrict, Ziwei Avenue Subdistrict

The only township is Gaozhuang Township

Yindu District
Subdistricts:
 Beimeng Subdistrict, Dianchang Road Subdistrict, Lizhen Subdistrict, Meiyuanzhuang Subdistrict, Qingfeng Avenue Subdistrict, Shachang Subdistrict, Shuiye Subdistrict, Tiexi Road Subdistrict, Xiangtai Subdistrict

The only township is Xijiao Township

Linzhou
Subdistricts:
 Guiyuan Subdistrict, Longshan Subdistrict, Kaiyuan Subdistrict, Zhenlin Subdistrict

Towns:
 Caisang, Donggang, Dongyao, Guilin, Hejian, Hengshui, Heshun, Lingyang, Linqi, Rencun, Wulong, Yaocun, Yuankang

Townships:
 Chadian Township, Chengjiao Township, Shiban Township

Anyang County
Towns:
 Baibi, Baizhuang, Cuijiaqiao, Lücun, Qugou, Shanying, Shuiye, Tongye

Townships:
 Anfeng Township, Beiguo Township, Duli Township, Hanling Township, Honghetun Township, Jiangcun Township, Leikou Township, Lunzhang Township, Majia Township, Wadian Township, Xincun Township, Xujiagou Township, Yonghe Township

Hua County
Towns:
 Baidaokou, Chengguan, Daokou, Gaoping, Laodian, Liugu, Niutun, Shangguan, Wangu, Wangzhuang

Townships:
 Baliying Township, Banpodian Township, Cizhouzhai Township, Dazhai Township, Jiaohu Township, Laoyemiao Township, Sangcun Township, Sijianfang Township, Wagangzhai Township, Xiaopu Township, Zaocun Township, Zhaoying Township

Neihuang County
Towns:
 Chengguan, Chuwang, Dongzhuang, Houhe, Jingdian, Liangzhuang, Tianshi

Townships:
 Bocheng Township, Dougong Township, Er'an Township, Gaodi Township, Liucun Township, Mashang Township, Shipantun Township, Songcun Township, Zhanglong Township, Zhongzhao Township

Tangyin County
Towns:
 Caiyuan, Chengguan, Rengu, Wuling, Yigou

Townships:
 Baiying Township, Fudao Township, Guxian Township, Hanzhuang Township, Wagang Township

Hebi

Heshan District
Subdistricts:
 Heshan Road Subdistrict, Jiukuang Square Subdistrict, Xinhua Avenue Subdistrict, Zhongshan Road Subdistrict, North Zhongshan Road Subdistrict

The only town is Hebiji, and the only township is Jijiashan Township

Qibin District
The only subdistrict is Jinshan Subdistrict

Towns:
 Dalaidian, Jiuqiao

Townships:
 Dahejian Township, Shangyu Township

Other:
 Qibin Economic and Technological Development Zone

Shancheng District
Subdistricts:
 Central Changfeng Road Subdistrict, Hongqi Subdistrict, Lulou Subdistrict, Shancheng Road Subdistrict, Tanghe Avenue Subdistrict

The only town is Shilin, and the only township is Lulou Township

Qi County, Hebi
Subdistricts:
 Lingshan Subdistrict, Qiaomeng Subdistrict, Weidu Subdistrict, Zhaoge Subdistrict

Towns:
 Beiyang, Gaocun, Miaokou, Xigang

The only township is Huangdong Township

Xun County
Towns:
 Chengguan, Liyang, Shantang, Tunzi, Weixian, Xiaohe, Xinzhen

Townships:
 Baisi Township, Wangzhuang Township

Jiaozuo

Jiefang District
Subdistricts:
 Jiaobei Subdistrict, Jiaonan Subdistrict, Jiaoxi Subdistrict, Minsheng Subdistrict, Minzhu Subdistrict, Qibaijian Subdistrict, Shangbaizuo Subdistrict, Wangzhe Subdistrict, Xinhua Subdistrict

Macun District
Subdistricts:
 Anyangcheng Subdistrict, Beishan Subdistrict, Daiwang Subdistrict, Fengying Subdistrict, Jiulishan Subdistrict, Macun Subdistrict, Yanma Subdistrict

Shanyang District
Subdistricts:
 Baijianfang Subdistrict, Dinghe Subdistrict, Dongfanghong Subdistrict, Guangya Subdistrict, Jiaodong Subdistrict, Liwan Subdistrict, Taihang Subdistrict, Xincheng Subdistrict, Yixing Subdistrict, Zhongxing Subdistrict

Zhongzhan District
Subdistricts:
 Danhe Subdistrict, Fengfeng Subdistrict, Fucheng Subdistrict, Lifeng Subdistrict, Longdong Subdistrict, Longxiang Subdistrict, Wangfeng Subdistrict, Xuheng Subdistrict, Yueshan Subdistrict, Zhucun Subdustrict

Mengzhou
Subdistricts:
 Dading Subdistrict, Heyang Subdistrict, Heyong Subdistrict, Huichang Subdistrict

Towns:
 Chengbo, Gudan, Huagong, Huaishu, Nanzhuang, Xiguo, Zhaohe

Qinyang
Subdistricts:
 Qinyuan Subdistrict, Taihang Subdistrict, Tanhuai Subdistrict, Huaiqing Subdistrict

Towns:
 Baixiang, Chongyi, Shanwangzhuang, Xifang, Xixiang, Ziling

Townships:
 Changping Township, Wangqu Township, Wangzhao Township

Bo'ai County
Towns:

Townships:
 Jincheng Township, Sujiazuo Township, Zhaihuo Township

Wen County
Towns:
 Fantian, Huangzhuang, Nanzhangqiang, Wenquan, Wude, Xiangyun, Zhaobao

Townships:
 Beileng Township, Yuecun Township, Zhaoxian Township

Wuzhi County
Towns:
 Dafeng, Longyuan, Mucheng, Ningguo, Xieqiying, Xitao, Zhandian

Townships:
 Beiguo Township, Dahongqiao Township, Gedangdian Township, Guanmiao Township, Jiaying Township, Sanyang Township, Xiaodong Township

Xiuwu County
Towns:
 Chengguan, Xunfeng

Townships:
 Anshang Township, Gaocun Township, Qixian Township, Wuliyuan Township, Xicun Township, Zhouzhuang Township

Jiyuan

Subdistricts:
 Beihai Subdistrict, Jishui Subdistrict, Qinyuan Subdistrict, Tiantan Subdistrict, Yuquan Subdistrict

Towns:
 Chengliu, Dayu, Kejing, Lilin, Potou, Shaoyuan, Sili, Wangwu, Wulongkou, Xiaye, Zhicheng

Kaifeng

Gulou District
Subdistricts:
 Jiucun Subdistrict, Wolong Subdistrict, Wuyi Subdistrict, Xiangguosi Subdistrict, Xianrenzhuang Subdistrict, Xinhua Subdistrict, Xisimen Subdistrict, Zhouqiao Subdistrict

Jinming District
Subdistricts:
 Chengxi Subdistrict, Liangyuan Subdistrict

The only town is Xinghuaying

Townships:
 Shuidao Township, Xijiao Township

Longting District
Subdistricts:
 Beidaomen Subdistrict, Beishudian Subdistrict, Daxing Subdistrict, Xuchaomen Subdistrict

Townships:
 Beijiao Township, Liuyuankou Township

Shunhe Hui District
Subdistricts:
 Caomen Subdistrict, Gongye Subdistrict, Pingguoyuan Subdistrict, Qingping Subdistrict, Songmen Subdistrict, Tieta Subdistrict

Townships
 Dongjiao Township, Tubaigang Township

Yuwangtai District
Subdistricts:
 Caishi Subdistrict, Fanta Subdistrict, Guanfang Subdistrict, Sanlibao Subdistrict, Xinmenguan Subdistrict

Townships:
 Nanjiao Township, Wangtun Township

Kaifeng County
Towns:
 Baliwan, Chengguan, Chenliu, Qiulou, Quxing, Zhuxian

Townships:
 Banpodian Township, Duliang Township, Fancun Township, Liudian Township, Luowang Township, Wanlong Township, Xijiangzhai Township, Xinglong Township, Yuanfang Township

Lankao County
Towns:
 Chengguan, Guyang, Hongmiao, Nanzhang, Zhangjunmu

Townships:
 Batou Township, Chengguan Township, Guying Township, Mengzhai Township, Putaojia Township, Sanyizhai Township, Xiaosong Township, Xuhe Township, Yanlou Township, Yifeng Township, Zhuaying Township

Qi County, Kaifeng
Towns:
 Chengguan, Fuji, Gaoyang, Gegang, Wulihe, Xingkou (邢口镇, Yanggu, Yuzhen

Townships:
 Banmu Township, Chengjiao Township, Guanzhuang Township, Hugang Township, Nigou Township, Peicundian Township, Pingcheng Township, Shawo Township, Shiyuan Township, Sumu Township, Xizhai Township, Zhulin Township, Zongdian Township

Tongxu County
Towns:
 Changzhi, Chengguan, Shugang, Sisuolou, Yuhuangmiao, Zhusha

Townships:
 Dagangli Township, Dige Township, Fengzhuang Township, Liancheng Township, Lizhuang Township, Sunying Township

Weishi County
Towns:
 Chengguan, Caizhuang, Shibali, Shuipo, Weichuan, Yongxing, Zhangshi, Zhuqu, Daying

Townships:
 Dama Township, Daqiao Township, Gangli Township, Menlouren Township, Nancao Township, Xiaochen Township, Xingzhuang Township, Zhuangtou Township

Luohe

Shaoling District
Subdistricts:
 Dizhuang Subdistrict, Tianqiao Avenue Subdistrict

Towns:
 Dengxiang, Jishi, Laowo, Shaoling, Wanjin

Townships:
 Houxie Township, Qingniancun Township

Yancheng District
The only subdistrict is Shabei Subdistrict

Towns:
 Chengguan, Longcheng, Mengmiao, Peicheng, Shangqiao, Xindian

Townships:
 Heilongtan Township, Liji Township

Yuanhui District
Subdistricts:
 Ganhechen Subdistrict, Laojie Subdistrict, Malu Avenue Subdistrict, Shunhe Avenue Subdistrict

The only town is Daliu

Townships:
 Kongzhongguo Township, Wenshi Township, Yinyangzhao Township

Linying County
Towns:
 Chengguan, Duqu, Fancheng, Juling, Sanjiadian, Taichen, Wadian, Fanggang, Wocheng

Townships:
 Chenzhuang Township, Daguo Township, Guxiang Township, Huangdimiao Township, Shiqiao Township, Wangmeng Township

Wuyang County
Towns:
 Beiwudu, Lianhua, Mengzhai, Taiwei, Wucheng, Wuquan, Xin'an

Townships:
 Baohe Township, Houji Township, Jiangdian Township, Jiujie Township, Macun Township, Wenfeng Township, Zhanghua Township

Luoyang

Chanhe Hui District
Subdistricts:
Dongguan Subdistrict, Yangwen Subdistrict, Chanxi Subdistrict, Beiyao Subdistrict, Wugu Road Subdistrict

The only township is Chanhe Hui Ethnic Township

Jianxi District
Subdistricts:
Hubei Road Subdistrict, Changchun Road Subdistrict, Tianjin Road Subdistrict, Chongqing Road Subdistrict, Chang'an Road Subdistrict, Wuhan Road Subdistrict, Zhengzhou Road Subdistrict, Zhujiang Road Subdistrict, Nanchang Road Subdistrict, Zhoushan Road Subdistrict, Xujiaying Subdistrict

Jili District
The only two subdivisions are Daqing Road Subdistrict and Jili Township

Laocheng District
Subdistricts:
Xibeiyu Subdistrict, Xinanyu Subdistrict, Dongbeiyu Subdistrict, Dongnanyu Subdistrict, Xiguan Subdistrict, Nanguan Road Subdistrict

Luolong District
Subdistricts:
Anle Subdistrict, Kaiyuan Road Subdistrict, Longmen Grottoes Subdistrict

Towns:
Longmen, Baimasi, Guanlin, Anle Town, Xindian, Licun, Zhuge, Lilou

The only township is Gucheng Township

Xigong District
Subdistricts:
Wangcheng Road Subdistrict, Xigong Subdistrict, East Kaixuan Road Subdistrict, Jinguyuan Subdistrict, Daobei Road Subdistrict, Mangling Road Subdistrict, Hantun Road Subdistrict, Tanggong Road Subdistrict

Townships:
Luobei Township, Hongshan Township

Yanshi
Towns:
Chengguan, Shouyangshan, Dianzhuang, Zhaizhen, Yuetan, Guxian, Goushi, Fudian, Gaolong, Koudian, Pangcun

Townships:
Shanhua Township, Mangling Township, Dakou Township

Luanchuan County
Towns:
Chengguan, Chitudian, Heyu, Tantou, Sanchuan, Lengshui, Taowan

Townships:
Luanchuan Township, Miaozi Township, Qiuba Township, Shizimiao Township, Baitu Township, Jiaohe Township, Shimiao Township

Luoning County
Twelve towns:
Chengguan, Wangfan Hui Town, Shangge, Xiayu, Hedi, Dongsong, Xinghua, Madian, Guxian, Zhaocun, Changshui, Jingyang

Six townships: 
Chengjiao Township, Xiaojie Township, Luoling Township, Dizhang Township, Chenwu Township, Jiankou Township

Dongsong
Villages:
Dongsong, Xi, Zhangzhuang, Qijiagou, Niuzhuang, Yaogou, Zhou, Jiayao, Dasong, Xiaosong, Fangli, Xiwu, Liuyu, Ma, Guo, Niefen, Baiyuan, Yangshuwa, Wangzhuang, Guandong, Guanxi, Guannan, Dingzhai, Luowa, Shanzhuang, Xiahedi, Zhaiyan, Zhonghedi, Beijiuxian, Shangsongyao, Wangling, Xiasongyao, Shanghedi, Zhaoce, Hegou, Miaoxia, Nanjiuxian

Mengjin County
Towns:
Chengguan, Huimeng, Pingle, Songzhuang, Baihe, Chaoyang, Xiaolangdi, Matun, Hengshui, Changdai

Ruyang County
Towns:
Chengguan, Shangdian, Fudian, Xiaodian

Townships:
Baishu Township, Shibapan Township, Jincun Township, Wangping Township, Santun Township, Liudian Township, Taoying Township, Neibu Township, Caidian Township

Song County
Towns:
Chengguan, Tianhu, Jiuxian, Checun, Yanzhuang, Deting, Dazhang, Baihe, Zhifang

Townships:
Daping Township, Kuqu Township, Hecun Township, Fanpo Township, Jiudian Township, Huangzhuang Township, Muzhijie Township

Xin'an County
Towns:
Chengguan, Shisi, Wutou, Cijian, Tiemen, Shijing, Cangtou, Beiye, Zhengcun, Nanlicun

Townships:
Caocun Township

Yichuan County
Towns:
Chengguan, Minggao, Shuizhai, Pengpo, Gaoshan

Townships:
Yaling Township, Pingdeng Township, Jiuhou Township, Gezhai Township, Baiyuan Township, Baisha Township, Banpo Township, Jiangzuo Township, Lüdian Township

Yiyang County
Towns:
Chengguan, Fengli, Liuquan, Hancheng, Baiyang, Xuncun, Jinping

Townships:
Yanzhen Township, Gaocun Township, Sanxiang Township, Zhangwu Township, Muce Township, Shangguan Township, Lianzhuang Township, Zhaobao Township, Dongwangzhuang Township, Xiangcun Township

Nanyang

Wancheng District
Subdistricts:
Dongguan Subdistrict, Xinhua Subdistrict, Hanye Subdistrict, Zhongjing Subdistrict, Baihe Subdistrict, Zaolin Subdistrict

Towns:
Guanzhuang, Wadian, Hongniwan, Huangtaigang

Townships:
Lihe Township, Hanzhong Township, Jinhua Township, Cha'an Township, Gaomiao Township, Xindian Township

Wolong District
Subdistricts:
Qiyi Subdistrict, Wolonggang Subdistrict, Wuhou Subdistrict, Meixi Subdistrict, Chezhan Subdistrict, Guangwu Subdistrict, Jingang Subdistrict, Zhangheng Subdistrict, Bailixi Subdistrict

Towns:
Shiqiao, Liaohe, Angao, Pushan, Luying, Qinghua, Yingzhuang

Townships:
Qiliyuan Township, Xiezhuang Township, Wangcun Township, Longxing Township

Dengzhou
Subdistricts:
Huazhou Subdistrict, Gucheng Subdistrict, Tuanhe Subdistrict

Towns:
Luozhuang, Jitan, Rangdong, Menglou, Linba, Goulin, Shilin, Zhangcun, Dusi, Zhaoji, Liuji, Sangzhuang, Pengqiao

Townships:
Zhanglou Township, Bainiu Township, Xiaji Township, Peiying Township, Wenqu Township, Gaoji Township, Taoying Township, Xiaoyangying Township, Jiaodian Township, Longyan Township, Jiulong Township

Fangcheng County
Towns:
Chengguan, Dushu, Bowang, Guaihe, Xiaoshidian, Zhaohe, Guangyang

Townships:
Quanqiao Township, Yangji Township, Erlangmiao Township, Guzhuangdian Township, Yanglou Township, Qinghe Township, Liuhe Township, Xilidian Township, Yuandian Hui Ethnic Township

Nanzhao County
Towns:
Chengguan, Liushan, Yunyang, Huangludian, Nanhedian, Banshanping, Qiaoduan, Baitugang

Townships:
Chengjiao Township, Xiaodian Township, Huanghou Township, Taishanmiao Township, Shimen Township, Sikeshu Township, Mashiping Township, Cuizhuang Township

Neixiang County
Towns:
Chengguan, Xiaguan, Shigang, Mashankou, Tuandong, Chimei, Wating, Wangdian, Guanzhang, Taoxi

Townships:
Banchang Township, Daqiao Township, Zhaodian Township, Qiliping Township, Yuguan Township, Zuopi Township

Sheqi County
Towns:
Sheqi Town, Qiaotou, Raoliang, Xinglong, Jinzhuang, Lidian, Miaodian, Haozhai, Zhuji, Xiawa, Taihe, Dafengying

Townships:
Chengjiao Township, Mopi Township, Tangzhuang Township

Tanghe County
Subdistricts:
Binhe Subdistrict, Wenfeng Subdistrict | 文峰街道)

Towns:
Yuantan, Zhangdian, Guotan, Huyang, Heilong, Dahetun, Longtan, Tongzhaipu, Cangtai, Shangtun, Bidian, Shaobaisi

Townships:
Chengjiao Township, Tonghe Township, Zangang Township, Qiyi Township, Mazhenfu Township, Gucheng Township, Dongwangji Township

Tongbai County
Towns:
Chengguan, Yuehe, Wucheng, Guxian, Maoji, Dahe, Bujiang, Pingshi, Huaiyuan

Townships:
Chengjiao Township, Huilong Township, Huanggang Township, Zhuzhuang Township, Anpeng Township, Chengwan Township, Xinji Township

Xichuan County
Subdistricts:
Longcheng Subdistrict, Shangsheng Subdistrict

Towns:
Jiuchong, Xianghua, Houpo, Cangfang, Laocheng, Madeng, Shangji, Jinhe, Siwan, Jingziguan, Shengwan

Townships:
Maotang Township, Xihuang Township, Taohe Township, Dashiqiao Township

Xinye County
Subdistricts:
Hanhua Subdistrict, Hancheng Subdistrict

Towns:
Wangzhuang, Shayan, Xindianpu, Wuxing, Shi'an, Waizi, Lihepu, Wangji

Townships:
Chengjiao Township, Qiangaomiao Township, Fanji Township, Shangzhuang Township, Shanggang Township

Xixia County
Subdistricts:
Baiyu Subdistrict, Zijin Subdistrict, Lianhua Subdistrict

Towns:
Danshui, Xiping, Shuanglong, Huiche, Dinghe, Sangping, Miping, Wuliqiao, Taiping, Chongyang

Townships:
Tianguan Township, Yangcheng Township, Zhaigen Township, Shijiehe Township, Junmahe Township, Erlangping Township

Zhenping County
Subdistricts:
Nieyang Subdistrict, Xuefeng Subdistrict, Yudu Subdistrict

Towns:
Shifosi, Chaobei, Jiasong, Houji, Laozhuang, Luyi, Zheshan, Gaoqiu, Qutun, Zaoyuan, Yangying

Townships:
Liuquanpu Township, Erlong Township, Wanggang Township, Mazhuang Township, Zhanglin Township, Anziying Township, Pengying Township, Guozhuang Hui Ethnic Township

Pingdingshan

Shilong District
Subdistricts:
Gaozhuang Subdistrict, Longxing Subdistrict, Renmin Road Subdistrict, Longhe Subdistrict

Weidong District
Subdistricts:
Dong'an Road Subdistrict, Youyue Road Subdistrict, Wuyi Road Subdistrict, Jianshe Road Subdistrict, East Ring Road Subdistrict, Donggongrenzhen Subdistrict, Guanghua Road Subdistrict, Hongying Subdistrict, Huangtai Subdistrict, North Ring Road Subdistrict, Donggaohuang Subdistrict, Pucheng Subdistrict

Xinhua District
Subdistricts:
Shuguang Avenue Subdistrict, Guangming Road Subdistrict, Zhongxing Road Subdistrict, Kuanggong Road Subdistrict, Xishichang Subdistrict, Xinxinjie Subdistrict, Qingshishan Subdistrict, North Zhanhe Road Subdistrict, Hubin Road Subdistrict, Xigaohuang Subdistrict

Towns:
Jiaodian, Zhiyang

Zhanhe District
Subdistricts:
Mazhuang Subdistrict, South Ring Road Subdistrict, Yaomeng Subdistrict, Jiulishan Subdistrict, Qinggong Road Subdistrict, Gaoyang Road Subdistrict

The only town is Beidu and the only township is Caozhen Township

Ruzhou
Subdistricts:
Meishan Subdistrict, Fengxue Road Subdistrict, Zhonglou Subdistrict, Xi'erhe Subdistrict, Runan Subdistrict

Towns:
Jiliao, Wenquan, Linru, Xiaotun

Townships:
Yanglou Township, Mangchuan Township, Wangzhai Township, Lingtou Township, Miaoxia Township, Zhifang Township, Shangzhuang Township, Qiling Township, Dayu Township, Xiadian Township, Jiaocun Township

Wugang
Subdistricts:
Yakou Subdistrict, Sipo Subdistrict, Zhulan Subdistrict, Yuanling Subdistrict, Kuangjian Subdistrict

Towns:
Shangdian, Batai, Yinji

Townships:
Zaolin Township, Miaojie Township, Tieshan Township, Wugong Township, Yangzhuang Township

Baofeng County
The only subdistrict is Tielu Subdistrict

Towns:
Chengguan, Zhouzhuang, Naodian, Shiqiao, Shangjiuwu, Daying, Zhangbaqiao, Yangzhuang

Townships:
Xiaoqi Township, Zhaozhuang Township, Qianying Township, Lizhuang Township

Jia County
Towns:
Chengguan, Zhongjia, Anliang, Tangjie, Xuedian, Changqiao

Townships:
Wangji Township, Likou Township, Ciba Township, Guangkuotiandi Township, Huangdao Township, Baimiao Township, Zhayuan Township, Yaozhuang Hui Ethnic Township

Lushan County
Subdistricts:
Lufeng Subdistrict, Qintai Subdistrict, Luyang Subdistrict, Huiyuan Subdistrict

Towns:
Xiatang, Liangwa, Zhangguanying, Zhangliang, Yaoshan

Towns:
Zhaocun Township, Sikeshu Township, Tuancheng Township, Xiongbei Township, Nanghe Township, Wawu Township, Guanyinsi Township, Zhaopingtaikuqu Township, Beizi Township, Cangtou Township, Dongzhou Township, Zhangdian Township, Xinji Township, Gunziying Township, Malou Township

Ye County
Towns:
Kunyang, Rendian, Bao'an, Xiantai, Zunhuadian

Townships:
Chengguan Township, Xiali Township, Changcun Township, Tianzhuang Township, Jiuxian Township, Xindian Township, Longquan Township, Shuizhai Township, Liancun Township, Dengli Township, Gongdian Township, Hongzhuangyang Township, Mazhuang Hui Ethnic Township

Puyang

Hualong District
Subdistricts:
Zhongyuan Road Subdistrict, Shengli Road Subdistrict, Jianshe Road Subdistrict, Renmin Road Subdistrict, Daqing Road Subdistrict, Huanghe Road Subdistrict, Renqiu Road Subdistrict, Kunwu Road Subdistrict, Huangfu Road Subdistrict, Zhongyuan Oil Field Subdistrict

Townships:
Yuecun Township, Mengke Township, Hucun Township, Wangzhu Township, Xindiao Township

Others:
Puyang Development Zone, Baitiaohe Farm

Fan County
Towns:
Chengguan, Pucheng

Townships:
Xinzhuang Township, Yangji Township, Chenzhuang Township, Baiyege Township, Wanglou Township, Yancunpu Township, Longwangzhuang Township, Luji Township, Zhangzhuang Township, Gaomatou Township

Nanle County
Towns:
Chengguan, Hanzhang, Yuancun, Fukan

Townships:
Yangcun Township, Zhangguotun Township, Qiankou Township, Gujinlou Township, Xishao Township, Sizhuang Township, Liangcun Township, Jindegu Township

Puyang County
Towns:
Chengguan, Liutun, Wenliu, Qingzu, Basongqiao, Xuzhen, Hubuzhai, Luhe

Townships:
Qinghetou Township, Liangzhuang Township, Wangchenggu Township, Baigang Township, Liyuan Township, Wuxing Township, Zi'an Township, Huzhuang Township, Langzhong Township, Haitong Township, Qucun Township, Diaocheng Township

Qingfeng County
Towns:
Chengguan, Mazhuangqiao, Wawutou, Xianzhuang, Liuge

Townships:
Liuta Township, Gongying Township, Macun Township, Gaobao Township, Gucheng Township, Daliu Township, Hancun Township, Datun Township, Gucheng Township, Shuangmiao Township, Zhifang Township, Yangshao Township

Taiqian County
Towns:
Chengguan, Houmiao

Townships:
Houfang Township, Qingshuihe Township, Malou Township, Sunkou Township, Dayuchen Township, Jiahe Township, Wuba Township

Sanmenxia

Hubin District
Subdistricts:
Hubin Subdistrict, Qianjin Subdistrict, Chezhan Subdistrict, Jianhe Subdistrict, Da'an Subdistrict, Huixing Subdistrict, Yadi Subdistrict, Xiangyang Subdistrict

Townships:
Jiaokou Township, Cizhong Township, Gaomiao Township

Yima
Subdistricts:
Qianqiu Road Subdistrict, Chaoyang Road Subdistrict, Xinyi Avenue Subdistrict, Changcun Road Subdistrict, Taishan Road Subdistrict, Xinqu Subdistrict, Dongqu Subdistrict

Lingbao
Towns:
Chengguan, Yinzhuang, Zhuyang, Yangping, Guxian, Yuling, Lingbao, Yangdian, Hanguguan, Jiaocun

Townships:
Chuankou Township, Sihe Township, Sucun Township, Wumiao Township, Xiyan Township

Lushi County
Towns:
Chengguan, Duguan, Wulichuan, Guandaokou, Zhuyangguan, Guanpo, Fanli, Dongming

Townships:
Wenyu Township, Hengjian Township, Mogoukou Township, Shuanghuaishu Township, Tanghe Township, Wayaogou Township, Shiziping Township, Shahe Township, Xujiawan Township, Panhe Township, Mutong Township

Mianchi County
Towns:
Chengguan, Yinghao, Zhangcun, Hongyang, Tianchi

Townships:
Yangshao Township, Rencun Township, Guoyuan Township, Chencun Township, Potou Township, Duancun Township, Nancun Township

Shan County
Towns:
Daying, Yuandian, Xizhangcun, Guanyintang

Townships:
Zhangbian Township, Zhangwan Township, Caiyuan Township, Zhangmao Township, Wangjiahou Township, Xiashi Township, Xilicun Township, Gongqian Township, Dianzi Township

Shangqiu

Liangyuan District
Subdistricts:
Qianjin Subdistrict, Changzheng Subdistrict, Baba Subdistrict, Dongfeng Subdistrict, Zhongzhou Subdistrict, Baiyun Subdistrict, Pingyuan Subdistrict, Jianshe Subdistrict, Pingtai Subdistrict, Ping'an Subdistrict

Towns:
Xieji, Shuangba, Zhangge

Townships:
Zhouji Township, Shuichipu Township, Guantang Township, Wanglou Township, Lizhuang Township, Sunfuji Township, Liukou Township

Suiyang District
Subdistricts:
Gucheng Subdistrict, Wenhua Subdistrict, Dongfang Subdistrict, Xincheng Subdistrict

Towns:
Songji, Guocun, Likou, Gaoxin

Townships:
Gusong Township, Yanji Township, Fengqiao Township, Wuqiang Township, Baogongmiao Township, Loudian Township, Maogudui Township, Luhe Township, Lema Township, Linhedian Township

Yongcheng
Towns:
Yanji, Chengguan, Mangshan, Gaozhuang, Zancheng, Peiqiao, Maqiao, Xuehu, Jiangkou, Chenji, Shibali

Township:
Chengxiang Township, Houling Township, Huangkou Township, Xinqiao Township, Shuangqiao Township, Wangji Township, Lizhai Township, Wolong Township, Longgang Township, Mamu Township, Zanyang Township, Taiqiu Township, Shunhe Township, Tiaohe Township, Liuhe Township, Chenguanzhuang Township, Miaoqiao Township, Huicun Township

Minquan County
Towns:
Chengguan, Renhe, Longtang, Beiguan, Chengzhuang, Wangzhuangzhai

Townships:
Huayuan Township, Yindian Township, Sunliu Township, Yegang Township, Shuangta Township, Linqi Township, Chumiao Township, Laoyanji Township, Shunhe Township, Wangqiao Township, Bodang Hui Ethnic Township, Huji Hui Ethnic Township

Ningling County
Towns:
Chengguan, Zhanggong, Liuhe, Luogang, Shiqiao

Townships:
Huanggang Township, Huabao Township, Liulou Township, Chenglou Township, Qiaolou Township, Chengjiao Township, Yangyi Township, Kongji Township, Zhaocun Township

Sui County
Towns:
Zhoutang, Pinggang, Chaozhuang, Changgang, Liaodi, Xilingsi, Shangtun, Chengguan

Townships:
Chengjiao Township, Youjitun Township, Heji Township, Hutang Township, Baimiao Township, Houtai Township, Dongdian Township, Jiangang Township, Kuangcheng Township, Bailou Township, Sunjuji Township, Hedi Township

Xiayi County
Towns:
Chengguan, Huiting, Matou, Jiyang, Liji, Chezhan, Yangji, Handaokou

Townships:
Caoji Township, Huqiao Township, Qihe Township, Guodian Township, Yemiao Township, Zhongfeng Township, Luozhuang Township, Sanggu Township, Heying Township, Wangji Township, Liudianji Township, Luoji Township, Taiping Township, Kongzhuang Township, Huodian Township, Beizhen Township

Yucheng County
Towns:
Chengguan, Jiegou, Yingguo, Duji, Gushu, Dayangji, Jiazhai, Limin, Zhangji, Shaogang

Townships:
Huangzhong Township, Shaji Township, Dianji Township, Zhanji Township, Wenji Township, Mangzhongqiao Township, Liudian Township, Dahou Township, Chengjiao Township, Zhengji Township, Lilaojia Township, Zhenligu Township, Guwangji Township, Liuji Township, Qiaoji Township, Tianmiao Township

Zhecheng County
Towns:
Chengguan, Chenqingji, Qitai, Huxiang, Cisheng, Anping, Yuanxiang

Townships:
Shaoyuan Township, Zhangqiao Township, Liangzhuang Township, Hong'en Township, Laowangji Township, Dawu Township, Maji Township, Niucheng Township, Huiji Township, Bogang Township, Gangwang Township, Shenqiao Township, Liyuan Township, Huangji Township

Xinxiang

Fengquan District
Subdistricts:
Baoxi Subdistrict, Baodong Subdistrict

The only town is Dakuai

Townships:
Luwangfen Township, Genghuang Township

Hongqi District
Subdistricts:
Xijie Subdistrict, Dongjie Subdistrict, Qudong Subdistrict, Nangandao Subdistrict, Xiangyangxiaoqu Subdistrict

Towns:
Hongmen, Xiaodian

The only township is Guandi Township

Muye District
Subdistricts:
Donggandao Subdistrict, Rongxiao Road Subdistrict, Beigandao Subdistrict, Huayuan Subdistrict, Weibei Subdistrict, Xinhui Road Subdistrict, Heping Road Subdistrict

The only town is Wangcun and the only township is Muye Township

Weibin District
Subdistricts:
Shengli Road Subdistrict, Jiefang Road Subdistrict, Zhongtong Avenue Subdistrict, Jiankang Road Subdistrict, Ziyou Road Subdistrict, Nanqiao Subdistrict, Tiexi Subdistrict

The only township is Pingyuan Township

Huixian
Subdistricts:
Chengguan Subdistrict, Huqiao Subdistrict

Towns:
Baobi, Yuhe, Baiquan, Mengzhuang, Changcun, Wucun, Nancun, Nanzhai, Shangbali, Beiyunmen, Zhancheng

Townships:
Huangshui Township, Gaozhuang Township, Zhangcun Township, Hongzhou Township, Xipingluo Township, Paishitou Township, Zhaogu Township, Shayao Township, Jitun Township

Weihui
Towns:
Jishui, Taigong, Sunxingcun, Houhe, Liyuantun, Tangzhuang, Shanglecun

Townships:
Shibaotou Township, Andu Township, Dunfangdian Township, Liuzhuang Township, Pangzhai Township, Chengjiao Township

Changyuan County
Subdistricts:
Puxi Subdistrict, Pudong Subdistrict, Nanpu Subdistrict, Pubei Subdistrict

Towns:
Dingluan, Xiangxiang, Weizhuang, Naoli, Changcun, Zhaodi, Menggang, Mancun

Townships:
Lugang Township, Miaozhai Township, Fangli Township, Wuqiu Township, Shejia Township, Zhangsanzhai Township

Fengqiu County
Towns:
Chengguan, Huangling, Huangde, Yingju, Chenqiao, Zhaogang, Liuguang, Pandian Township

Townships:
Chengguan Township, Hui Township, Wangcun Township, Chengu Township, Juxiang Township, Lugang Township, Jinggong Township, Caogang Township, Lizhuang Township, Yingang Township, Fengcun Township

Huojia County
Towns:
Chengguan, Zhaojing, Huangdi, Zhonghe, Xuying, Fengzhuang, Kangcun, Shizhuang, Taishan

Townships:
Weizhuang Township, Daxinzhuang Township

Other:
Xigong District Administrative Committee

Xinxiang County
Towns:
Zhaipo, Xiaoji, Qiliying, Langgongmiao, Guguzhai, Dazhaoying

The only township is Hehe Township

Others:	
Xinxiang Economic Development Zone

Yanjin County
Towns:
Chengguan, Dongtun, Fengzhuang

Townships:
Senggu Township, Shipogu Township, Weiqiu Township, Sizhai Township, Wanglou Township, Mazhuang Township, Zuocheng Township, Yulin Township, Xiaotan Township

Yuanyang County
Towns:
Chengguan, Yuanwu, Shizhai

Townships:
Gebukou Township, Funingji Township, Zhulou Township, Qiaobei Township, Handongzhuang Township, Jiangzhuang Township, Guanchang Township, Dabin Township, Doumen Township, Qijie Township, Taipingzhen Township, Luzhai Township, Yang'a Township, Jintang Township

Xinyang

Pingqiao District
Subdistricts:
Yangshan Subdistrict, Qianjin Subdistrict, Nanjing Road Subdistrict, Pingqiao Subdistrict, Gan’an Subdistrict, Wulidian Subdistrict

Towns:
Minggang, Wuli, Xingji, Pingchang, Yanghe

Townships:
Xiaowang Township, Longjing Township, Hudian Township, Pengjiawan Township, Changtai Township, Xiaodian Township, Wanggang Township, Gaoliangdian Township, Chashan Township

Shihe District
Subdistricts:
Laocheng Subdistrict, Minquan Subdistrict, Chezhan Subdistrict, Wulidun Subdistrict, Wuxing Subdistrict, Hudong Subdistrict, Nanwan Subdistrict, Jinniushan Subdistrict, Shuangjing Subdistrict

Towns:
Lijiazhai, Wujiadian, Dongshuanghe

Townships:
Youhe Township, Dongjiahe Township, Shihegang Township, Tanjiahe Township, Liulin Township, Ersanliqiao Township

Guangshan County
Subdistricts:
Xianshan Subdistrict, Zishui Subdistrict

Towns:
Suntiepu, Pobeihe, Baique, Shilimiao, Mafan, Zhuanqiao, Zhaihe

Townships:
Yanhe Township, Huaidian Township, Yinpeng Township, Wenshu Township, Xianju Township, Beixiangdian Township, Nanxiangdian Township, Luochen Township, Hushan Township, Liangting Township

Gushi County
Towns:
Chengguan, Sanhejian, Chenlinzi, Liji, Wangliu, Guolutan, Jiangji, Huzupu, Fangji, Duanji, Fenshuiting

Townships:
Chengjiao Township, Wangpeng Township, Shahepu Township, Nandaqiao Township, Hongbu Township, Chenji Township, Xuji Township, Fenggang Township, Magang Township, Caomiaoji Township, Zhangguangmiao Township, Shifodian Township, Quanhepu Township, Liushudian Township, Wumiaoji Township, Zushimiao Township, Zhaogang Township, Zhanglaobu Township, Yangji Township, Lidian Township

Huaibin County
Towns:
Chengguan, Langan, Fanghu, Xinli, Maji, Qisi, Zhaoji

Townships:
Taitou Township, Wangjiagang Township, Gucheng Township, Sankongqiao Township, Zhangli Township, Luji Township, Dengwan Township, Zhangzhuang Township, Wangdian Township, Gudui Township

Huangchuan County
Subdistricts:
Chunshen Subdistrict, Dingcheng Subdistrict, Yiyang Subdistrict, Laocheng Subdistrict

Towns:
Shuangliushu, Sanpisi, Butaji, Renhe, Fudian, Xuezi, Taolinpu, Huangsigang, Jiangjiaji

Townships:
Chuanliudian Township, Weigang Township, Zhangji Township, Lailong Township, Longgu Township, Tandian Township, Shangyougang Township, Baidian Township

Luoshan County
Towns:
Chengguan, Zhoudang, Nangan, Zhugan, Qingshan, Zilu, Lingshan, Pengxin, Panxin

Townships:
Longshan Township, Gaodian Township, Youdian Township, Dongpu Township, Mangzhang Township, Miaoxian Township, Zhutang Township, Tiepu Township, Shandian Township, Dingyuan Township

Shangcheng County
Towns:
Chengguan, Shangshiqiao, Shuangchunpu, Wangqiao, Yuji, Yangang, Daquandian, Fengji

Townships:
Jingangtai Township, Fengdian Township, Liji Township, Nianyushan Township, Suxianshi Township, Wanggang Township, Wuhe Township, Changzhuyuan Township, Hefengqiao Township, Guanmiao Township, Fushan Township

Xi County
Towns:
Chengguan, Baoxin, Xiazhuang, Dongyue, Xiaohuidian, Xiangdian

Townships:
Chengjiao Township, Sunmiao Township, Lukou Township, Zhangtao Township, Pengdian Township, Yangdian Township, Baitudian Township, Gangjidian Township, Changling Township, Chenpeng Township, Linhe Township, Guandian Township, Caohuanglin Township, Balicha Township

Xin County
Towns:
Xinji, Shawo, Balifan, Wuchenhe, Suhe

Townships:
Zhouhe Township, Huwan Township, Qianjin Township, Chendian Township, Kafang Township, Guojiahe Township, Jianchanghe Township, Sidian Township, Doushanhe Township, Tianpu Township

Xuchang

Weidu District
Subdistricts:
Xidajie Subdistrict, Dongdajie Subdistrict, Xiguan Subdistrict, Nanguan Subdistrict, Beidajie Subdistrict, Wuyi Road Subdistrict, Gaoqiaoying Subdistrict, Dingzhuang Subdistrict, Bandaihe Subdistrict, Qilidian Subdistrict, Wenfeng Subdistrict, Xinxing Subdistrict

Changge
Subdistricts:
Jianshe Road Subdistrict, Changxing Road Subdistrict, Changshe Road Subdistrict, Jinqiao Road Subdistrict

Towns:
Heshangqiao, Pohu, Houhe, Shigu, Laocheng, Nanxi, Dazhou, Dongcun

Townships:
Zengfumiao Township, Guanting Township, Shixiang Township, Guqiao Township

Yuzhou
Subdistricts:
Yingchuan Subdistrict, Xiadu Subdistrict, Hancheng Subdistrict, Juntai Subdistrict

Towns:
Huolong, Shundian, Fangshan, Shenhou, Hongchang, Liangbei, Gucheng, Wuliang, Wenshu

Townships:
Zhuge Township, Changzhuang Township, Huashi Township, Jiushan Township, Mojie Township, Zhangde Township, Xiaolü Township, Fanpo Township, Chuhe Township, Guolian Township, Qianjing Township, Fanggang Township, Shanhuo Hui Ethnic Township

Xiangcheng County
Towns:
Chengguan, Yingqiao Hui Town, Mailing, Yingyang, Wangluo, Ziyun, Kuzhuang

Townships:
Zhanbei Township, Shantoudian Township, Cigou Township, Dingying Township, Jiangzhuang Township, Fanhu Township, Shuangmiao Township, Fenchen Township, Shilipu Township

Xuchang County
Towns:
Jiangguanchi, Wunüdian, Shangji, Suqiao, Jiangliji, Zhangpan, Lingjing

Townships:
Chencao Township, Dengzhuang Township, Xiaozhao Township, Hejie Township, Guicun Township, Zhenjian Township, Yulin Township, Changcunzhang Township, Aizhuang Hui Ethnic Township

Yanling County
Towns:
Anling, Malan, Bailiang, Chenhuadian, Wangtian, Zhangqiao, Nanwu, Taocheng, Zhile, Dama, Pengdian, Mafang

Zhoukou

Chuanhui District
Subdistricts:
Chenzhou Subdistrict, Qiyi Subdistrict, Fangzhi Road Subdistrict, Renhe Subdistrict, Xiaoqiao Subdistrict, Chengnan Subdistrict, Chengbei Subdistrict, Chengdong Subdistrict, Bankou Subdistrict

The only township is Libukou Township

Xiangcheng City
Subdistricts:
Huayuan Subdistrict, Shuizhai Subdistrict, Dongfang Subdistrict, Lianhua Subdistrict, Guangwu Subdistrict, Qianfoge Subdistrict

Towns:
Nandun, Sundian, Lizhai, Jialing, Gaosi, Xinqiao, Fuji, Guanhui, Dingji, Zhengguo, Moling, Wangmingkou

Townships:
Yongfeng Township, Fanji Township, Sanzhang Township

Dancheng County
Towns:
Chengguan, Wutai, Nanfeng, Baima, Ningping, Yilu, Qiandian, Jizhong, Shicao

Townships:
Chengjiao Township, Hutougang Township, Jishui Township, Zhangwanji Township, Dingcun Township, Shuanglou Township, Qiuqu Township, Dongfeng Township, Baji Township, Lilou Township, Huji Township

Fugou County
Towns:
Chengguan, Cuiqiao, Jiangcun, Baitan, Jiuyuan, Liansi, Daxin, Baotun, Biangang

Townships:
Caoli Township, Chaigang Township, Gucheng Township, Lütan Township, Dalizhuang Township, Chengjiao Township

Huaiyang County
Towns:
Chengguan, Xinzhan, Lutai, Sitong, Lincai, Anling

Townships:
Zhuji Township, Doumen Township, Fengtang Township, Liuzhentun Township, Wangdian Township, Dalian Township, Gedian Township, Huangji Township, Bailou Township, Qilao Township, Zhengji Township, Caohe Township, Xuwan Township

Luyi County
Towns:
Chengguan, Xuanwu, Zaoji, Taiqinggong, Wangpiliu, Shiliang, Xinji, Mapu, Wobei

Townships:
Luyi Township, Zhengjiaji Township, Guantang Township, Shengtiezhong Township, Zhangdian Township, Zhaocun Township, Renji Township, Tangji Township, Gaoji Township, Qiuji Township, Mudian Township, Yanghukou Township, Jiatan Township

Others:
Taiqing Farm, Huowang Farm, Qianli Farm, Zaoji Farm, Houdilou Farm

Shangshui County
Subdistricts:
Xinchengqu Subdistrict, Dongchengqu Subdistrict, Laocheng Subdistrict

Towns:
Huangzhai, Lianji, Weiji, Guqiang, Baisi, Bacun, Tanzhuang, Dengcheng, Huji

Townships:
Chengguan Township, Pingdian Township, Yuanlao Township, Huahe Township, Yaoji Township, Shuzhuang Township, Dawu Township, Zhangming Township, Haogang Township, Zhangzhuang Township, Tangzhuang Township

Other:
Shangshui County Farm

Shenqiu County
Subdistricts:
Dongcheng Subdistrict, Beicheng Subdistrict

Towns:
Liuzhuangdian, Liufuji, Laocheng, Zhaodeying, Fujing, Zhidian, Xin’anji, Baiji, Liuwan, Huaidian Hui Town

Townships:
Lianchi Township, Shicaoji Township, Fanying Township, Lilaozhuang Township, Daqiuzhuang Township, Fengying Township, Zhouying Township, Hongshan Township, Beiyangji Township, Bianlukou Township

Taikang County
Towns:
Chengguan, Changying, Sunmukou, Laozhong, Zhukou, Matou, Longqu, Banqiao, Fucaolou, Machang, Maozhuang

Townships:
Chengjiao Township, Yangmiao Township, Wangji Township, Gaoxian Township, Zhimawa Township, Qingji Township, Dutang Township, Daxuzhai Township, Wulikou Township, Zhangji Township, Gaolang Township, Zhuanlou Township

Xihua County
Towns:
Chengguan, Xixiating, Xiaoyao, Fengmu, Honghuaji, Niedui, Dongxiating, Xihuaying, Zhifang

Townships:
Tiankou Township, Qingheyi Township, Piying Township, Dongwangying Township, Dawangzhuang Township, Lidazhuang Township, Yebukou Township, Chiying Township, Huangtuqiao Township, Aigang Township

Zhumadian

Yicheng District
Subdistricts:
Renmin Subdistrict, Dongfeng Subdistrict, Xiyuan Subdistrict, Xinhua Subdistrict, Nanhai Subdistrict, Laojie Subdistrict, Xianglin Subdistrict, Xuesong Subdistrict, Shunhe Subdistrict, Liuge Subdistrict

The only town is Shuitun

Townships:
Zhushi Township, Zhugudong Township, Humiao Township, Gucheng Township, Guanwangmiao Township

Others:
Jinhe Office, Jinqiao Office,  Jinshan Office

Biyang County
Towns:
Bishui, Shahedian, Yangpeng, Magutian, Banqiao, Chunshui

Townships:
Gaodian Township, Chenzhuang Township, Gaoyi Township, Wangdian Township, Tongshan Township, Laohe Township, Xiabeisi Township, Xianghe Township, Fuzhuang Township, Jialou Township, Huangshankou Township, Guoji Township, Taishanmiao Township, Guanzhuang Township, Yangjiaji Township, Shuangmiaojie Township, Shewan Township, Huayuan Township

Pingyu County
Towns:
Guhuai, Yangbu, Donghedian, Miaowan, Sheqiao, Xiyangdian

Townships:
Donghuangmiao Township, Gaoyangdian Township, Shizilu Township, Houliu Township, Wanzhong Township, Yuhuangmiao Township, Guolou Township, Litun Township, Laowanggang Township, Xindian Township, Wanjindian Township, Shuangmiao Township

Queshan County
Towns:
Panlong, Zhugou, Rendian, Xin’andian, Liuzhuang, Liudian, Yifeng

Townships:
Sanlihe Township, Shigunhe Township, Wagang Township, Lixindian Township, Shuanghe Township, Jinhuisi Township

Runan County
Towns:
Runing, Wanggang, Liangzhu, Hexiao, Laojunmiao, Liupen, Jinpu

Townships:
Sanmenzha Township, Sanlidian Township, Sanqiao Township, Nanyudian Township, Changxing Township, Guanzhuan Township, Hanzhuang Township, Luodian Township, Zhanglou Township, Bandian Township

Shangcai County
Towns:
Caidu, Huangbu, Yangji, Zhuhu, Dangdian, Zhuli, Huapi

Townships:
Lugang Township, Daluli Township, Wuliangsi Township, Shaodian Township, Wulong Township, Yangtun Township, Hedian Township, Caigou Township, Taqiao Township, Qihai Township, Chongli Township, Hanzhai Township, Dong’an Township, Donghong Township, Xiaoyuesi Township, Xihong Township, Baijin Township

Suiping County
Towns:
Quyang, Chezhan, Yushan

Townships:
Changzhuang Township, Hexing Township, Shenzhai Township, Huaishu Township, Chayashan Township, Yangfeng Township, Huazhuang Township, Wencheng Township, Zhutang Township, Shizhaipu Township

Others:
Chayashanxiang Scenic Area, Fengminggu Scenic Area

Xincai County
Towns:
Gulü, Zhuandian, Chendian, Fogesi, Liancun, Changcun, Hanji, Longkou, Huanglou, Sunzhao, Liqiao Hui Town

Townships:
Shilipu Township, Yudian Township, Hewu Township, Guanjin Township, Songgang Township, Dungang Township, Jiantou Township, Yangzhuanghu Township, Huazhuang Township, Licheng Township, Mituosi Township

Xiping County
Subdistricts:
Baicheng Subdistrict, Baiting Subdistrict

Towns:
Wugouying, Quanzhai, Shiling, Chushan

Townships:
Huancheng Township, Chongqu Township, Chayao Township, Renhe Township, Songji Township, Tandian Township, Lüdian Township, Lumiao Township, Yangzhuang Township, Zhuantan Township, Erlang Township, Jiaozhuang Township, Caizhai Hui Ethnic Township

Other:
Laowangpo Farm

Zhengyang County
Towns:
Zhenyang, Handong, Runanbu, Tongzhong, Dougou, Xiongzhai

Townships:
Shenshui Township, Fuzhai Township, Yuanzhai Township, Xinruandian Township, Youfangdian Township, Leizhai Township, Wangwuqiao Township, Yongxing Township, Lühe Township, Dalin Township, Pidian Township, Pengqiao Township, Lanqing Township

Other:
Wusan Farm

References

 
Henan
Townships